The Salmson 9 AD was a family of air-cooled nine cylinder radial aero-engines produced in the 1930s in France by the Société des Moteurs Salmson.

Design and development
The 9 AD followed Salmson practice after the First World War, of being air-cooled and utilising the Canton-Unne epicyclic geared crank-case system.

Variants
9 ADThe standard production model with LH rotation direct drive.
9 ADb
9 ADr
British Salmson AD.9Production of the Salmson 9AD in Great Britain by the British Salmson Company at New Malden, Surrey.
British Salmson A.D.9R srsIIIThe A.D.9 with a 0.5:1 reduction gear

Applications

Specifications (9 AD)

See also
Salmson air-cooled aero-engines
Salmson water-cooled aero-engines
List of aircraft engines

Notes

References

 
 

Salmson aircraft engines
1920s aircraft piston engines
1930s aircraft piston engines
1940s aircraft piston engines
Aircraft air-cooled radial piston engines